The Commanding General of the United States Army was the title given to the service chief and highest-ranking officer of the United States Army (and its predecessor the Continental Army), prior to the establishment of the Chief of Staff of the United States Army in 1903.  During the American Revolutionary War (1775–1783), the title was Commander-in-Chief of the Continental Army.  In 1783, the title was simplified to Senior Officer of the United States Army.  In 1821, the title was changed to Commanding General of the United States Army.  The office was often referred to by various other titles, such as "Major General Commanding the Army" or "General-in-Chief".

From 1789 until its abolition in 1903, the position of commanding general was legally subordinate to the Secretary of War; it was replaced by the creation of the statutory Chief of Staff of the Army in 1903.

Officeholders

† denotes people who died in office.

Commander-in-Chief of the Continental Army

Senior Officer of the United States Army

Commanding General of the United States Army

|-style="text-align:center;"
|colspan=8|Position vacant(11 March 1862 – 23 July 1862) 
|-

Timeline

See also
United States military seniority

Notes

Bibliography
 Historical Resources Branch; United States Army Center of Military History.

United States Army organization

1775 establishments in the Thirteen Colonies
1903 disestablishments in the United States